Bench is an unincorporated community in Caribou County, in the U.S. state of Idaho.

Geography
Bench is located along Niter-Bench Road, at 42°30′13″N 111°40′49″W.

History
 The community of Bench is part of the Gem Valley, an area that also includes the communities of Grace, Turner, Central, Lund, Bancroft, and Niter.

A post office called Bench was established in 1902, and remained in operation until 1923. The community was named for a prominent landform near the original town site, commonly referred to as a "bench". The "settlers attempted dry farming with little success"; the Bench Canal Company was formed to provide irrigation to the area. The Bench Canal, a 27-mile-long irrigation system, received water in July 1902, but was not completed until October 1919, due to the scarcity of labor caused by servicemen entering World War I.

In 1906, Bench was on the Soda Springs-Lago stagecoach line, which connected Grace, Niter, and Bench to the community of Soda Springs, which would in 1919 become the county seat of Caribou County. Bench's population was 75 in 1909.

In addition to the post office, a number of businesses operated in Bench. In the early 1900s, Bench's sawmill was owned by the Tolman family. Bench's school operated into the mid 20th century.

Bench is closely associated with the nearby community of Niter; the two communities, separated by the Bench Canal, shared a newspaper column, titled "Niter-Bench", in the Caribou County Sun from 1957 to 1977.

Bench regulated kissing on Sunday, requiring the participants to "'pause for breath' between each kiss."

References

Unincorporated communities in Caribou County, Idaho
1902 establishments in Idaho